Arthur L. Doering, Jr. (November 4, 1915 – November 5, 1988) was a golfer who played in PGA Tour events from the 1930s through the 1960s.

Doering was a member of the golf team and the Class of 1940 at Stanford University in Palo Alto, California. He is a member of the Stanford Athletic Hall of Fame.

Doering turned professional in 1945. His best career finish in a stroke play major championship was a T-41 at the 1938 U.S. Open while he was a student a Stanford and still an amateur. He lost in the round of 32 (T-17) at the 1954 PGA Championship.

Doering earned his only PGA Tour victory at the 1951 Greater Greensboro Open. 

In the early 1960s, Doering was president and head pro at the Yolo Fliers Club in Woodland, California. During his tenure, he oversaw the building of a new clubhouse.

Amateur wins (1)
this list may be incomplete
1940 Trans-Mississippi Amateur

Professional wins (3)

PGA Tour wins (1)
1951 Greater Greensboro Open

Other wins (3)
this list may be incomplete
1939 Santa Clara County Championship
1954 Metropolitan Open
1955 Long Island Open

American male golfers
Stanford Cardinal men's golfers
PGA Tour golfers
Golfers from California
1915 births
1988 deaths